The City and County Building, also known as the City-County Building, at 19th St. and Carey Ave. in Cheyenne, Wyoming, was built during 1917–1919.  It was designed by architect William Dubois in Classical Revival style.

It was listed on the National Register of Historic Places in 1978. It was deemed significant for association with the Laramie County government and the City of Cheyenne governments' development, as well as "for the quality
of its craftsmanship and detailing."  It combined city hall and courthouse functions and originally held 14 county and six city offices, besides courts.

References

External links
City & County Building, Nineteenth & Carey Avenue, Cheyenne, Laramie, WY at the Historic American Buildings Survey (HABS)

Government buildings on the National Register of Historic Places in Wyoming
Neoclassical architecture in Wyoming
Government buildings completed in 1919
Buildings and structures in Laramie County, Wyoming
Historic American Buildings Survey in Wyoming
National Register of Historic Places in Cheyenne, Wyoming
City and town halls in Wyoming
City and town halls on the National Register of Historic Places in Wyoming